College Hall is a fully catered hall of residence of the University of London. It is situated on Malet Street in the Bloomsbury district of central London. It is an intercollegiate hall, and as such provides accommodation for full-time students at constituent colleges and institutions of the University, including King's College, University College, Queen Mary, the London School of Economics and the School of Oriental and African Studies amongst others.

History
The hall was established in 1882 in Byng Place to cater for female students. It was co-founded by educationalist and suffragist Annie Leigh Browne, Mary Stewart Kilgour, Mary Browne (Lady Lockyer) and Henrietta Müller. The first Principal was Eleanor Grove, who arranged for lease of the house in Byng Place, assisted by Rosa Morison; the pair volunteered to take the posts with no salary. 

College Hall was incorporated into the University of London in 1910. It moved to nearby Malet Street in 1932. College Hall provides 357 rooms to women and men.

Structure
Each of the intercollegiate halls of residence is managed by a Hall Manager. Every hall also has a Warden and a number of resident Senior Members. The Hall Managers and their staff work full-time during office hours, while the Wardens and Senior Members, commonly referred to as the Wardenial staff, are part-time staff who are either studying or working in academic or academic-related roles elsewhere in the University of London.

The Junior Common Room (JCR) Committee, elected by the students, provides social and sporting activities.

Transport
The nearest underground stations are Goodge Street to the west, Euston Square to the north and Russell Square to the east.

See also
Connaught Hall, London
International Hall, London

References

 College Hall, University of London (downloadable from University of London web page)
 College Hall, University of London: Summer Housing (downloadable from University of London web page)

University of London intercollegiate halls of residence
Buildings and structures in Bloomsbury